Khosrovan (also Romanized as Khosrovān and Khosravān) is a village in Abarshiveh Rural District, in the Central District of Damavand County, Tehran Province, Iran. At the 2006 census, its population was 126, in 36 families.

References 

Populated places in Damavand County